The soundtrack to the film Suspiria was composed and performed by the Italian band Goblin. A single version of the title track, "Suspiria", was released with the B-side "Blind Concert".

The title song from the soundtrack was featured in the trailer for the 2011 film Jane Eyre.

In 2018, Claudio Simonetti's incarnation of the band went on the Suspiria Tour to coincide with the release of the film's 2018 remake. The band performed the soundtrack in its entirety with a live screening of the original film.

Legacy 
Due to the film's success and legacy, the soundtrack remains one of Goblin's most popular albums. In an interview with Fact Magazine, Simonetti referred to the album as the band's masterpiece.

Track listing

Personnel 
 Goblin
 Agostino Marangolo: drums, percussion, vocals
 Massimo Morante: Electric guitars, acoustic guitars, bouzouki, vocals
 Fabio Pignatelli: Fender Precision Bass (fretless), Rickenbacker bass (fretted), tabla, acoustic guitar, vocals
 Claudio Simonetti: Mellotron (presets: 3-Violins, church organ and 8-Choir), Elka organ, Logan violin, Celesta, Fender Rhodes electric piano, grand piano, Moog synthesizers (Minimoog and System 55)

 Additional
 Antonio Marangolo: Saxophone (on "Black Forest")
 Maurizio Guarini (uncredited): Additional keyboards, including the Moog synthesizers and other keyboards listed on Roller

References 

Film scores
Progressive rock soundtracks
1977 soundtrack albums